"Sweeter as the Years Go By" is a Christian hymn written by Lelia N. Morris in 1912. It has been included in 87 hymnals. Its subject-matter is expressed in the refrain:

It has been recorded in various, mostly gospel, styles. In 1929, it was recorded by Blind Willie Johnson on vocals and acoustic guitar in a gospel blues style under the title "Sweeter as the Years Roll By" (even though he sings "Go" throughout). Columbia Records released the song at the end of October 1931, on n the then-standard 78 rpm record format, with "Take Your Stand" as the flip-side.

References 

Gospel songs
1912 songs
Blind Willie Johnson songs
Columbia Records singles